José David Moya Rojas (born 7 August 1992) is a Colombian professional footballer who plays as a defender for Categoría Primera A club Independiente Santa Fe.

Career statistics

Club

1 Includes Superliga Colombiana

References

External links 

1992 births
Living people
Colombian footballers
Atlético Huila footballers
Leones F.C. footballers
Cortuluá footballers
Independiente Santa Fe footballers
Deportes Tolima footballers
Categoría Primera A players
Categoría Primera B players
Association football defenders
People from Huila Department